Hemavan Tärnaby Airport  is an airport in Hemavan, Sweden. The nearest villages are Hemavan and Tärnaby, both of which are ski resorts. Also many Norwegians from Mo i Rana and surroundings use the airport. It is located in Storuman Municipality (Västerbotten County), which was 1994-2010 the only municipality in Sweden with two airports operating scheduled flights. The other airport, Storuman Airport, is closed for traffic since 2010.

Ground transport
Taxis and rental cars are available. The road distance to Hemavan is 1 km, to Tärnaby  and Mo i Rana, Norway, .

Airlines and destinations

Statistics

See also
 List of the largest airports in the Nordic countries

References

External links

 Hemavan Tärnaby Airport (English)

Airports in Sweden
Buildings and structures in Västerbotten County